Canonico or Canónico is a surname. Notable people with the surname include: 

Benito Canónico (1894–1971), Venezuelan composer, musician, orchestrator, and teacher
Daniel Canónico (1916–1975), Venezuelan baseball player
Gerard Canonico (born 1989), American actor and singer